Traditional boat race is a Southeast Asian Games sport since the 1993 edition, with an exception in 1999, 2001 and in 2009, the traditional boat race not held.

Medal summary

Medal table

Medalists

Men

500m(10 crews)

500m(20 crews)

1000m(10 crews)

1000m(20 crews)

Women

500m(10 crews)

1000m(10 crews)

Sports at the Southeast Asian Games
 
Southeast Asian Games